The Harley-Davidson Freewheeler is a motorized tricycle introduced by Harley-Davidson in August, 2014 for the 2015 model year. It is designated the FLRT.

It has a 1,690 cc displacement, air-cooled, V-twin engine with  torque and a six-speed transmission with reverse.

The model is distinguished from the other Harley three-wheeler, the Tri Glide Ultra Classic, by having mini ape hanger handlebars and bobtail fenders for a low profile.

The 2017 offering sports the new 107 cubic inch Milwaukee 8 engine.

The 2019 offering sports the new 114 cubic inch Milwaukee 8 engine.

See also

List of Harley-Davidson motorcycles
List of motorized trikes

References

External links

Freewheeler
Motorcycles introduced in 2014
Tricycle motorcycles